Slay is a shareware turn-based strategy game made by Sean O'Connor and released in the United Kingdom for Microsoft Windows in March 1995. It continues being ported to modern platforms, such as for Pocket PC in 2002, multiple mobile devices between 2007 and 2013, and on Steam in November 2016.

Gameplay
Slay is a hexagonal strategy game where the goal is to conquer the island by buying soldiers and peasants and using them to capture enemies' hexagons.

Reception
Slay received highly positive reviews. Eurogamer called it "perfectly honed" and "very satisfying", and Rock, Paper, Shotgun said it was "perfect", "so simple, so clever and so brutal". The mobile version also received positive reviews.

References

External links
 

1995 video games
Android (operating system) games
IOS games
Video games developed in the United Kingdom
Windows games